Colin Douglas Semper (5 February 1938 – 13 April 2022) was an English Anglican priest.

Semper was educated at Lincoln Grammar School and Keble College, Oxford, and was ordained in 1963. He began his ordained ministry as a curate at Holy Trinity with St Mary's in Guildford. He was Recruitment and Selection Secretary for the Advisory Council for the Church's Ministry until 1969 when he became Head of Religious Programmes for BBC Radio and Deputy Head of Religious Broadcasting for the BBC, positions he held for 13 years. He then became Provost of the Cathedral Church of St Michael, Coventry. and after that Treasurer of Westminster Abbey. In retirement he continued to serve as a non-stipendiary priest at St Mary's Frensham.

Notes

1938 births
2022 deaths
Alumni of Keble College, Oxford
BBC people
People educated at Lincoln Grammar School
Provosts and Deans of Coventry